Ivan F. Simpson (8 February 1875 – 12 October 1951) was a Scottish film and stage actor.

Life and career 
Simpson was born on 8 February 1875 in Glasgow, Scotland, and went as a young man to New York City, where he worked for four decades on Broadway from 1906 until his death. In 1915 he started his film silent career and starred in notable silent films like The Green Goddess from 1923, where he played the role of Mister Watkins. He also replied in this role seven years later in the sound film version of The Green Goddess. In 1929 he portrayed Hugh Myers in Disraeli, where he played along his close friend George Arliss. Arliss and Simpson appeared together in a total of nine films.

Especially in the 1930s, Simpson was a successful character actor in supporting and bit parts and appeared in many classics. He often played servants, like in MGM's literature adaption David Copperfield as Littimer and the horror movie Mark of the Vampire. He also portrayed priests like in Little Lord Fauntleroy and Random Harvest, judges like in This Land Is Mine or doctors like in They All Kissed the Bride. Simpson was also a frequent actor in the Errol Flynn movies, he appeared in The Adventures of Robin Hood, The Prince and the Pauper and Captain Blood.

Selected filmography 

 The Dictator (1915) – Simpson
 Out of the Drifts (1916) – Martin
 The Man Who Played God (1922) – Battle
 The Green Goddess (1923) – Watkins
 Twenty-One (1923) – Mr. Willis
 Twenty Dollars a Week (1925) – James Pettison
 Miss Bluebeard (1925) – Bounds
 Wild, Wild Susan (1925) – Malcolm
 Lovers in Quarantine (1925) – The Silent Passenger
 A Kiss for Cinderella (1925) – Mr. Cutaway
 Womanhandled (1925) – Butler (uncredited)
 Disraeli (1929) – Sir Hugh Myers (uncredited)
 Evidence (1929) – Peabody
 The Green Goddess (1930) – Watkins
 Isle of Escape (1930) – Judge
 Golden Dawn (1930) – Minor Role (uncredited)
 Inside the Lines (1930) – Capper
 Manslaughter (1930) – Morson
 Old English (1930) – Joe Pillin
 The Way of All Men (1930) – Higgins
 The Sea God (1930) – Pearly Nick
 The Lady Who Dared (1931) – Butler
 The Millionaire (1931) – Davis
 The Reckless Hour (1931) – Stevens – Adams' Butler (uncredited)
 Safe in Hell (1931) – Crunch
 The Man Who Played God (1932) – Battle
 A Passport to Hell (1932) – Simms
 The Crash (1932) – Hodge
 The Phantom of Crestwood (1932) – Mr. Vayne
 Sherlock Holmes (1932) – Faulkner
 The Monkey's Paw (1933) – Mr. White
 The Past of Mary Holmes (1933) – Jacob Riggs
 The Secret of Madame Blanche (1933) – Aubrey's Lawyer (uncredited)
 The Silk Express (1933) – Johnson, Kilgore's Secretary
 Midnight Mary (1933) – Tindle
 Voltaire (1933) – Lelain – Actor (uncredited)
 Blind Adventure (1933) – Perkins—Butler (uncredited)
 Charlie Chan's Greatest Case (1933) – Brade
 Her Secret (1933) – Lathrop
 Man of Two Worlds (1934) – Dr. Lott
 The Mystery of Mr. X (1934) – Hutchinson
 The House of Rothschild (1934) – Amschel Rothschild
 Murder in Trinidad (1934) – First Doctor (uncredited)
 Stingaree (1934) – Man with Beard (uncredited)
 The World Moves On (1934) – Clumber
 British Agent (1934) – Poohbah Evans
 Among the Missing (1934) – Smeed
 The Little Minister (1934) – Sanders Webster (uncredited)
 David Copperfield (1935) – Littimer
 Shadow of Doubt (1935) – Morse
 Mark of the Vampire (1935) – Jan
 The Bishop Misbehaves (1935) – Mr. Grantham
 Mutiny on the Bounty (1935) – Morgan
 Splendor (1935) – Fletcher
 East of Java (1935) – Resident (uncredited)
 The Great Impersonation (1935) – Dr. Harrison
 Captain Blood (1935) – Prosecutor
 Little Lord Fauntleroy (1936) – Rev. Mordaunt
 Trouble for Two (1936) – Collins
 Mary of Scotland (1936) – Judge
 Lloyd's of London (1936) – Old Man
 Maid of Salem (1937) – Rev. Parris
 The Prince and the Pauper (1937) – Clemens
 Night of Mystery (1937) – Sproot
 London by Night (1937) – Burroughs
 Youth on Parole (1937) – Minor Role (uncredited)
 45 Fathers (1937) – Chamberlain (uncredited)
 The Baroness and the Butler (1938) – Count Dormo
 Invisible Enemy (1938) – Michael
 The Adventures of Robin Hood (1938) – Proprietor of Kent Road Tavern
 Kidnapped (1938) – Old Man (uncredited)
 Marie Antoinette (1938) – Sauce (uncredited)
 Booloo (1938) – 1st Governor
 Made for Each Other (1939) – Simon – Judge Doolittle's Brother (uncredited)
 Never Say Die (1939) – Kretsky
 The Sun Never Sets (1939) – A Doctor (uncredited)
 The Adventures of Sherlock Holmes (1939) – Gates – Trial Prosecutor (uncredited)
 Rulers of the Sea (1939) – Secretary (uncredited)
 Tower of London (1939) – Anne's Protector (uncredited)
 The Earl of Chicago (1940) – Hargraves (uncredited)
 The Invisible Man Returns (1940) – Mr. Cotton (uncredited)
 New Moon (1940) – Guizot
 The Body Disappears (1941) – Dean Claxton
 Nazi Agent (1942) – Professor Sterling
 The Male Animal (1942) – Dean Frederick Damon
 They All Kissed the Bride (1942) – Dr. Cassell
 Eagle Squadron (1942) – Simms (uncredited)
 Youth on Parade (1942) – Dean Wharton
 Nightmare (1942) – Arnold – Money Changer
 Random Harvest (1942) – The Vicar
 My Kingdom for a Cook (1943) – Dexter
 Two Weeks to Live (1943) – Professor Albert Frisby
 This Land Is Mine (1943) – Judge
 Above Suspicion (1943) – Porter in Oxford (uncredited)
 My Kingdom for a Cook (1943) – Professor Harlow
 Government Girl (1943) – Judge Leonard (uncredited)
 Jane Eyre (1943) – Mr. Woods – the Minister (uncredited)
 The Uninvited (1944) – Will Hardy – Tobacconist (uncredited)
 The Hour Before the Dawn (1944) – Magistrate (uncredited)
 My Girl Tisa (1948) – Old Man (uncredited)

References

External links

 
 

1875 births
1951 deaths
Scottish male film actors
Scottish male stage actors
Scottish male silent film actors
British emigrants to the United States
Male actors from Glasgow
20th-century Scottish male actors
Burials at Kensico Cemetery